West Street Baptist Church (formerly Zion Chapel) is a Baptist church in East Grinstead, a town in the district of Mid Sussex, one of seven local government districts in the English county of West Sussex.  Founded in 1810 as a chapel linked to the Countess of Huntingdon's Connexion, it was the first Nonconformist place of worship in East Grinstead; the town's subsequent development made it a local centre of both Protestant Nonconformity and alternative religions.  The red-brick building is still used by a Baptist community, and is protected as a Grade II listed building.

History
East Grinstead was founded during or before the 13th century: little is known of its early history.  It officially became a market town in 1247 when it was granted a charter, but a market existed before this.  Standing on an isolated hilltop site in the Weald, away from the main timber-producing and ironworking areas which drove the local economy in the medieval period, it grew slowly over the next few centuries.

The north of Sussex developed a strong tradition of Nonconformism and Protestant dissent in the 16th, 17th and 18th centuries.  In 1676, 27% of the population of Ifield, a few miles west of East Grinstead, worshipped outside the communion of the Established Church of England; one of the world's first Quaker meeting houses was founded there in that year.  Baptist worship was prevalent in nearby Horsham, and members of the town's congregation travelled to Turners Hill, West Hoathly and other villages around East Grinstead to minister.  In 1676, 28 Nonconformists (representing 3.5% of the adult population) were recorded in East Grinstead, although no Baptist meetings were documented.

The completion in 1770 of the London–Brighton turnpike stimulated rapid growth in parts of Sussex in the late 18th century.  Although East Grinstead was not on the road, its population grew steadily and it became increasingly important economically.  By 1801, more than 2,600 people lived in the town.  Nonconformist religious views continued to prosper locally, and in 1810 the town's first non-Anglican church was established.  Zion Chapel was linked to the Countess of Huntingdon's Connexion, a small evangelical Calvinist denomination started in 1783 by Selina Hastings, Countess of Huntingdon.  John Burt, a rich merchant from nearby Forest Row, founded the church: he provided the money to build it, and on 2 July 1810 his sons laid the foundation stone.  Construction work continued until the following year, and the church was officially opened on 23 April 1811.  Prominent preacher Rowland Hill spoke at the inaugural service.

In May 1811, a Sunday school was started at the church.  It was the first in the area and catered for more than 100 children.  By the following year, four times this number attended, and the church itself was also expanding: galleries were added inside to accommodate 200 more worshippers.  In 1813, a manse was built next to the church, and further structural alterations were made in 1862 (when a classroom and vestry were built on to the church) and 1880, when the building was reordered and repaired.  A tiny burial ground stood in front of the church in its early years; the last burial was in 1846.

Members of Zion Chapel established a daughter church in nearby Turners Hill in 1824.  It was rebuilt in 1906 but was still part of the Countess of Huntingdon's Connexion; since then it has become an independent Free Church.  In April 1847, a schism occurred in Zion Chapel's congregation: some members left and founded a new Congregational church.  After worshipping in hired rooms around East Grinstead, they built Rocks Chapel as their permanent place of worship; the building held its first service on Good Friday 1850.  The building was later used by Methodists, but it was demolished after they opened a permanent church of their own.  Rocks Chapel stood on Old Road in East Grinstead.

The Countess of Huntingdon's Connexion sold Zion Chapel in 1980.  The following year, members of the town's Providence Strict Baptist Chapel moved in; their former place of worship on London Road was later demolished.  Under its present name of West Street Baptist Church, the building houses an evangelical Baptist congregation.  It is one of a wide range of religious buildings in East Grinstead, which has a reputation for unusual diversity in respect of both Protestant Nonconformity and alternative religions.  As well as Anglican, Roman Catholic, Methodist, Jehovah's Witnesses, Mormon, Baptist and United Reformed churches (and former Quaker, Christian Scientist and Salvation Army buildings), there are several Charismatic evangelical groups in the town; Rosicrucianism and Opus Dei have a presence; and the Church of Scientology's United Kingdom headquarters is at Saint Hill Manor.

Zion Chapel was listed at Grade II on 28 January 1948.

Architecture
The chapel is a small, red-brick building in the Classical style.  The brickwork is considered to be of high quality, and the building has been described as "restrained and dignified".  The façade has recessed semicircular arched windows and is topped with a pediment of brick, above which is a slate roof.  The later extensions to the side and in front changed the character of the building, and the original railings in front do not survive in their original condition.

See also
List of places of worship in Mid Sussex

Notes

Bibliography

Churches completed in 1811
19th-century Baptist churches in the United Kingdom
Grade II listed churches in West Sussex
Baptist churches in Mid Sussex District
1810 establishments in England
19th-century churches in the United Kingdom
Countess of Huntingdon's Connexion